Second Life, is a 2015 television series produced by Hong Kong Television Network. The first episode premiered on February 23, 2015.

Cast
 Wilfred Lau as Cheung Yuk-jit
 Terence Yin as Owen Gin
 Bondy Chiu as Joyce Chu
 Maggie Wong as young Joyce Chu
 Ann Ho as Yue Yue
 Cherry Pau as young Yue Yue
 Patrick Lui as Ho Zin-hou
 Joey Tang as Leung Ka-bou
 Ricksen Tam as young Leung Ka-bou
 Nick Chong as Brandon Cheung
 Kwok Fung as Cheung Kai-gam
 Bonnie Wong as Wong Lai-fan
 Maria Chen as Chan Sau-han
 Rocky Chan as Will Leung
 Emily Wong as Angel
 Anita Chan as Charlie Kwan
 Wong Ching as Chu Bak-gin
 Mannor Chan as Sam Mei-jan
 Lo Hoi-pang as Hung Fung
 Luvin Ho as reporter, episode 5

Song list
 "伴妳一生" by Terence Yin
 "知錯" by Wilfred Lau

References

External links
 Official website

Hong Kong Television Network original programming
2015 Hong Kong television series debuts
2010s Hong Kong television series